Kneria uluguru is a species of fish in the family Kneriidae endemic to Tanzania.  Its natural habitat is rivers.

References

Kneria
Endemic fauna of Tanzania
Freshwater fish of Tanzania
Taxonomy articles created by Polbot
Fish described in 1995
Taxa named by Lothar Seegers